Paxon may refer to:

 Bill Paxon (born 1954), U.S. Congressman from New York
 Paxon School for Advanced Studies
 Paxons, a xenophobic race mentioned in Clues (Star Trek: The Next Generation)

See also

 Paxson (disambiguation)
 Paxton (disambiguation)